Elena Tejada-Herrera is a trans-disciplinary artist who was born in Peru and became known for her work in performance and multidisciplinary arts. Her work promotes the participation of the public.

Performance 
Elena Tejada-Herrera began her artistic education in the mid-1990s, initially studying painting at the Arts Department at Pontificia Universidad del Peru, but attained public attention in a controversial way.

Work 
Elena Tejada-Herrera became known as a painter, but got great attention because of her performance art work.
In 1999 Tejada-Herrera presented her video performance Bomba and the Bataclana in the Belly Dance in which the artist appeared as a cabaret dancer along with street sellers that she hired to perform with her. This piece dealt with the body, gender constructions, and incorporated the participation of the public. The artist was awarded the first prize in the art contest Passport for an Artist for this artwork.

From 2002 to 2006, while living in Virginia, Tejada-Herrera focused each time more on pieces that incorporated the participation of the public, like the series Paper Animals, Holding the House Together, One Day Around The Neighborhood Choreographing My Dance. For this piece Tejada-Herrera asked strangers on stores, and in her neighborhood, to teach her how to dance and to choreograph her. Simultaneously she carried on landscape interventions on highways that addressed the drivers as her audience. Other pieces were performances interventions in malls and different public spaces

Collections 
Her work is part of the collection of the Museo de Arte de Lima in Peru.

References 

American multimedia artists
American performance artists
Year of birth missing (living people)
Living people
American conceptual artists
Women conceptual artists
American contemporary painters
American installation artists
American video artists
American women painters
American women performance artists
Audiovisual artists
Women installation artists
Women video artists
Interactive art
Hispanic and Latino American women in the arts
Peruvian painters
Peruvian women artists
Peruvian emigrants to the United States
20th-century American printmakers
20th-century American women artists
21st-century American painters
21st-century American women artists
American women printmakers